Scincella kikaapoa  is a species of skink endemic to Mexico. The specific name kikaapoa refers Kickapoo people from Coahuila, the region of the type locality of this species.

References

Scincella
Endemic reptiles of Mexico
Fauna of the Chihuahuan Desert
Reptiles described in 2010
Taxa named by Uri Omar García-Vázquez
Taxa named by Luis Canseco-Márquez
Taxa named by Adrián Nieto-Montes de Oca